Luza is the name of several inhabited localities in Russia.

Urban localities
Luza, Luzsky District, Kirov Oblast, a town in Luzsky District of Kirov Oblast; 

Rural localities
Luza, Slobodskoy District, Kirov Oblast, a village in Leninsky Rural Okrug of Slobodskoy District in Kirov Oblast; 
Luza, Zuyevsky District, Kirov Oblast, a village in Sezenevsky Rural Okrug of Zuyevsky District in Kirov Oblast; 
Luza, Udmurt Republic, a village in Yelovsky Selsoviet of Yarsky District in the Udmurt Republic
Luza, Vologda Oblast, a village in Viktorovsky Selsoviet of Velikoustyugsky District in Vologda Oblast